Ronald Jack Cowan (born 6 September 1959) is a Scottish politician and member of the Scottish National Party. He has served as the Member of Parliament (MP) for Inverclyde since the 2015 general election, having been re-elected in 2017 and 2019.

Early and personal life
Cowan was born in Greenock to former Greenock Morton and Scotland footballer Jimmy Cowan and his wife, May. He was educated at Greenock Academy and, despite growing up in a Labour Party-supporting household, joined the Scottish National Party at the age of 16.

Before standing for parliament, Cowan was the owner of an IT service company. During the campaign for the 2014 Scottish independence referendum, he ran the official "Yes" campaign in Inverclyde.

Career
At the 2015 election, Cowan overturned the 5,838-vote majority of incumbent Labour MP Iain McKenzie and turned it into a 11,063 majority for the SNP.

He was re-elected in the snap election of 2017, but saw his majority significantly reduced to just 384 votes. At the 2019 election, Cowan increased his majority to 7,512.

References

External links 

 
 Profile on SNP website

1959 births
Living people
Members of the Parliament of the United Kingdom for Scottish constituencies
People educated at Greenock Academy
People from Greenock
Scottish businesspeople
Scottish National Party MPs
UK MPs 2015–2017
UK MPs 2017–2019
UK MPs 2019–present